Historien om en fjälldal and Historien om en fjelldal in Norwegian (in Swedish: The History about a Mountain Valley) is a trilogy, written in Swedish, by a Norwegian-Swedish fantasy author Margit Sandemo, who has become better known for her historical suspense novels.

Historien om en fjälldal is a fictionalized series of books about her birth valley, Grunke in Fagernes in the province of Valdres, which is situated in Norway. They were published between 1992 and 1998.

Titles
 Örnens rike ("Realm of the Eagle")
 Korparnas dal ("Valley of the Ravens")
 Tranornas fristad ("Sanctuary of the Cranes")

References

Novel series
Novels by Margit Sandemo
Novels set in Norway